The Four Bitchin' Babes is a group of female singer-songwriters with rotating membership performing mainly humorous, satirical, or light-hearted songs in the folk genre. The current touring group consists of Sally Fingerett, Deirdre Flint, Christine Lavin, and Debi Smith. The artists have made numerous albums and have worked with producer Jeff Bova.

History 
Christine Lavin founded the band in 1990. She produced the compilation album On a Winter's Night, then put together a road show of the artists who appeared on it: Patty Larkin, Megon McDonough, Sally Fingerett, and Lavin. The foursome toured throughout the United States, after which Lavin decided to create a live album of their performance at The Birchmere entitled Buy Me, Bring Me, Take Me, Don't Mess My Hair, released on Rounder Records in 1990.

Larkin then signed with Windham Hill Records and left the band; she was replaced by Julie Gold, best known for writing the song "From a Distance". The group continued to tour and released their second album, Buy Me… Volume II in 1993. In the meantime, other artists would substitute in concert for band members who were unavailable, such as Cheryl Wheeler, Janis Ian, and Mary Travers. In 1994, Debi Smith replaced Julie Gold, and they released their third album Fax It, Charge It, Don't Ask Me What's For Dinner in 1995 on Shanachie Records.

In 1997, Lavin chose Camille West to replace her in the band, and the new lineup released the live album Gabby Road: Out Of The Mouths Of Babes, also recorded at the Birchmere. In 2001, the band released the album The Babes: Beyond Bitchin, produced by Jeff Bova, in addition to a live concert DVD. McDonough left the band in 2001 to perform a one-woman show, and she was replaced by Suzzy Roche, formerly of The Roches. In 2002, they released the album Some Assembly Required. In 2004, both West and Roche left the group and were replaced by Nancy Moran and Deirdre Flint. In 2006, they toured for their CD "Hormonal Imbalance: A Mood Swinging Musical Revue".

As of June 2022, the Four Bitch' Babes are touring, including a stop at The Birchmere, where they recorded their first album and see as an "unofficial home base". It may be their last formal tour and Smith, one of the co-leaders, says "We are winding it down".

There have been eleven different members (not counting guest or touring "Babes"), with the Four Bitchin' Babes currently consisting of Sally Fingerett, Deirdre Flint, Christine Lavin, and Debi Smith. Only Fingerett has been a member for their entire history.

Songwriting 
Typically, the Babes' albums consist of songs written by the individual members, all of whom have or have had solo careers as well. Songs appearing on their albums, such as "Microwave Life" (by McDonough), "B.O.B. (Battery-Operated Boyfriend)" and "L.A.F.F. (Ladies Against Fanny Floss)" (by West), and "Don't Mess With Me (I'm Somebody's Mother)" (by Fingerett), satirize modern life, especially from a mature female perspective.

Discography

References

External links 
Official website

All-female bands
American folk musical groups
American satirists
Women satirists
Shanachie Records artists
Rounder Records artists
American comedy musical groups
Musical groups established in 1990